Donald Charles Hume (6 September 1907 – 1986) was a male badminton player from England.

Badminton career
Hume won the All England Open Badminton Championships, considered the unofficial World Badminton Championships, in men's singles in 1930. He also won the Men's Doubles with Raymond M. White for four consecutive years from 1932 to 1935 and the mixed doubles with Betty Uber from 1933-1936.

He was part of the English touring team that visited Canada during 1930. A match was held at the Granite Club in Toronto which England won 7-2.

References

John Arlott (Ed.): The Oxford companion to sports & games. Oxford University Press, London 1975
All England champions 1899-2007

English male badminton players
1907 births
1986 deaths